Baladitya is an Indian actor, lyricist, dialogue writer, dubbing artist, and TV host who works in Telugu cinema and television. He started out as a child artiste (as Master Aditya) and is known for his roles in Edurinti Mogudu Pakkinti Pellam (1991) and Little Soldiers (1996). He is a recipient of two Nandi Awards.

Early life
Baladitya was born in Eluru, Andhra Pradesh to Y. S. Shankar and Kalyani.

Career
He made his debut as a child actor in Rajendra Prasad's Telugu comedy film Edurinti Mogudu Pakkinti Pellam. He acted in forty films as a child actor (in Telugu, Hindi, Tamil, Kannada and Malayalam) and ten films as a leading actor (in Telugu). He made his debut in a lead role in the movie Chantigadu (2003) directed by B. A. Jaya. He got three Nandi Awards, two as a child actor for Anna and Little Soldiers and one as an anchor for the kids' quiz show Champion. He played the male lead role in 1940 Lo Oka Gramam.

Baladitya hosted a quiz show called Champion in 2015 and 2016 which aired on ETV. He worked as the lead in a daily soap called Shambhavi, which was telecast on Star Maa. He plays the lead character in the Tamil serial, Rasaathi, which is popular on Sun TV.

Filmography

Film

As a child actor 

 Edurinti Mogudu Pakkinti Pellam (1991)
 Edurmaneli Ganda Pakkadmaneli Hendthi (1991) (Kannada)
 Rowdy Gaari Pellam (1991)
 Attintlo Adde Mogudu (1991)
 Jamba Lakidi Pamba (1992)
 Tyagi (1992) (Hindi)
 Aaj Ka Goonda Raj (1992) (Hindi)
 Bangaru Bullodu (1993)
 Abbaigaru (1993)
 Evandi Aavida Vachindi (1993)
 Hello Brother (1994)
 Anna (1994)
 Theerpu (1994)
 Super Police (1994)
 Diya Aur Toofan (1995) (Hindi)
 Sankalpam (1995)
 Maatho Pettukoku (1995)
 Little Soldiers (1996)
 Hitler (1997)
 Masmaram (1997) (Malayalam)
 Rettai Jadai Vayasu (1997) (Tamil)
 Lav Kush (1997) (Hindi)
 Naam Iruvar Namakku Iruvar (1998) (Tamil)
 Samarasimha Reddy (1999)

As an actor 

 Chantigadu (2003) as Chantigadu
 Keelu Gurram (2005)
 Vamsam as Chinna (2005)
 Sundaraaniki Tondarekkuva (2006)
 Roommates (2006) as Shekhar
 Sandhya (2007)
 Veta (2008)
 Bhadradri (2008)
 Jajimalli (2009)
 1940 Lo Oka Gramam (2010)
 Entha Manchivaadavuraa (2020)

Television

Awards
Nandi Awards
Best Child Actor - Anna (1994)
Best Child Actor - Little Soldiers (1996)

References

External links
 

Telugu male actors
Indian male film actors
Male actors in Telugu cinema
Male actors in Telugu television
Nandi Award winners
Indian male child actors
Male actors from Andhra Pradesh
People from Eluru
People from West Godavari district
Bigg Boss (Telugu TV series) contestants